Blagodatnoye is a rural locality in Gostomlyansky Selsoviet Rural Settlement, Medvensky District, Kursk Oblast, Russia. Population:

Geography 

 Climate
Blagodatnoye has a warm-summer humid continental climate (Dfb in the Köppen climate classification).

Transport 

References

Notes

Sources

Rural localities in Medvensky District